A-2 is a county-designated highway in the US state of Michigan running about  along the shores of Lake Michigan in the southwestern part of the Lower Peninsula. The county highway starts near the town of Lake Michigan Beach in Berrien County at an intersection with M-63 and follows Blue Star Highway through rural coastal areas. Running roughly parallel to its modern freeway replacement, Interstate 196 (I-196), A-2 passes through the cities of South Haven and Saugatuck before ending at an interchange with Business Loop Interstate 196/US Highway 31 (BL I-196/US 31) in Holland.

In the early part of the 20th century, what is now Blue Star Highway was part of two auto trails before becoming a state trunkline highway. In 1926, it was designated as a part of US 31 and kept that status until I-196 bypassed the roadway in the early 1960s. Two local business owners spurred the efforts to get the older highway restored to the state highway map in 1970, and the A-2 designation was created as a result.

Route description
From this intersection, the county highway runs northward through forest between Lake Michigan and the freeway in northern Berrien County. A-2 crosses into Van Buren County about a mile (1.6 km) later and continues winding north-northeasterly. At various locations, local roads connect the county road to interchanges with the freeway as the two run roughly parallel together. Blue Star Highway passes the Palisades Nuclear Generating Station near Covert before coming into the southern edge of South Haven.

In South Haven, A-2 bypasses downtown, rounding the district to the south and east. The county road intersects BL I-196 at Le Grange Street due south of downtown and M-43 a block later. In this area, Blue Star Highway is bounded by a mix of mostly commercial and some residential properties. On the north side of the city, A-2 intersects BL I-196 a second time at Phoenix Street and then continues due north out of town, crossing the Black River. The landscape transitions over to a rural forest area with residential properties as A-2 continues across the county line into Allegan County and passes the South Haven Country Club and some vineyards.

A-2 turns northeasterly near Glenn and crosses over I-196/US 31 to run east of the freeway. Blue Star Highway here follows 68th Street in the county road grid through the community of  Ganges. North of here, the freeway turns to the northeast and crosses under A-2. Blue Star Highway continues due north into Douglas. In the city, the county road is bounded by businesses as it S-curves northeasterly to cross a narrow spot of Kalamazoo Lake (part of the Kalamazoo River) into Saugatuck. A-2 bypasses downtown Saugatuck to its east and continues north and northeasterly out of town. The county road crosses over the freeway again and out to farmlands before turning north along 58th Street, well inland of I-196/US 31.

From here, A-2 runs due north and crosses I-196 one last time near the south side of the West Michigan Regional Airport; this crossing has no interchange. The county road passes under the west end of the airport's runway in a tunnel as it meanders along South Washington Avenue to an interchange with BL I-196/US 31 on the south side of the city of Holland where it terminates. South Washington Street continues northward into downtown without the county highway designation. As a county-designated highway, the  length of A-2 is maintained by the Berrien, Van Buren, and Allegan county road commissions (BCRC, VBCRC, ACRC) in their respective counties.

History
When auto trails were being developed in the early 20th century, the path of the modern A-2 was used for part of two. The first in 1912 was the West Michigan Pike, which ran from the Indiana state line north to the Straits of Mackinac along Lake Michigan. The second was the Western Mainline of the Dixie Highway in 1915. The state legislature created the State Trunkline Highway System on  May 13, 1913, and in the legislation, Division 5 corresponded to a highway along the western Lower Peninsula near Lake Michigan. Six years later, the system was signposted for the  first time, and the original M-11 ran along the former Division 5. In November 1926, the American Association of State Highway Officials approved the United States Numbered Highway System, and the state designated US 31 in Michigan along M-11. During World War II, the state highway department bypassed downtown South Haven, shifting US 31 out of downtown. US 31 was given the Blue Star Highway designation on October 10, 1948.

US 31 between the Benton Harbor and Holland areas was slated to become an Interstate Highway when that system debuted in the late 1950s. The first freeway segment in the area opened in 1962 northward from I-94 to near the Berrien–Van Buren county line, and an additional  opened the next year from the northern end of the freeway near the county line to Holland as I-196; US 31 was removed from Blue Star Highway to run along the new freeway.

Blue Star Highway was returned to county control, the US 31 highway signs were taken down, and the roadway was removed from the state highway maps with the completion of the freeway in the area. The owners of a motel in Saugatuck, Mr. and Mrs. Howard "Gene" Temple, received a large number of cancellations because travelers could not find their business. Mrs. Temple said that signage in the area was misleading, and she contacted local officials to get better highway signage for the road. These meetings resulted in a test program for the 1970 state highway map that marked Blue Star Highway as A-2; the Allegan County Road Commission spent $2,000 (equivalent to $ in ) to erect about 50 markers along the road in their county. At the time, the scheme was labeled "experimental". Later that year, the system was expanded in scope to the rest of the state. Mrs. Temple was credited as the first Michigan woman to secure a highway designation from the State Highway Commission.

The next year in 1971, A-2 was extended south to the junction with US 33 (now M-63) in Lake Michigan Beach. In 1972, BL I-196 in South Haven was realigned and no longer overlapped A-2. The South Washington Avenue section of A-2 on the south side of Holland was realigned in 2004 into a  tunnel to make way for an expansion of the runway at Tulip City Airport (now West Michigan Regional Airport). A roundabout was added at the intersection with North Shore Drive north of South Haven in 2010.

Major intersections

See also

References

External links

 A-2 at Michigan Highways

County-designated highways in Michigan
Transportation in Berrien County, Michigan
Transportation in Van Buren County, Michigan
Transportation in Allegan County, Michigan
U.S. Route 31